Stanford's Guides (est. 1850s) were a series of travel guide books to England and elsewhere published by Edward Stanford of London.

List of Stanford's Guides by geographic coverage

Americas

England

East Midlands region

East of England region

London region

North West England region

South East England region 
 
 
 
 
 1885 ed.
  + Index

South West England region 
 
 
 
 
 
 
 
 1888 ed.

West Midlands region 
 
  + Index

Yorkshire and the Humber region

France
 
 1858 ed.

Switzerland

List of Stanford's Guides by date of publication

1850s-1860s
 
 
 
 
 
 
 
 
 
 
 
 1858 ed.

1870s-1880s
 
 
 
 1885 ed.
 
 
 
 
 
 
 
 
 
 
 
 
 
 
 
 
 1888 ed.

1890s-1900s

References

Travel guide books
Series of books
Publications established in 1859
Tourism in the United Kingdom